The  is a professional wrestling tag team championship owned and promoted by the New Japan Pro-Wrestling (NJPW) promotion. The title is exclusively featured on NJPW's United States based television program NJPW Strong, essentially making it a U.S. Tag Team Championship. The current champions are The Motor City Machine Guns (Alex Shelley and Chris Sabin), who are in their first reign as a team as well as individually.

History
On June 8, 2022, NJPW announced the creation of the championship, with it being contested in an eight-team tournament that was then scheduled to determine the inaugural champions, culminating in a final match at Strong: High Alert on July 24, 2022. Aussie Open (Kyle Fletcher & Mark Davis) defeated Christopher Daniels & Yuya Uemura in the tournament final to become the inaugural champions.

Inaugural tournament

Reigns

The inaugural champions were Aussie Open (Kyle Fletcher and Mark Davis). Chris Sabin is the oldest champion at 40 while Kyle Fletcher is the youngest at 23.

The current champions are The Motor City Machine Guns (Alex Shelley and Chris Sabin), who are in their first reign, both as a team and individually. They defeated previous champions Aussie Open (Kyle Fletcher and Mark Davis) and team of The DKC and Kevin Knight in a three-way tag team match at Rumble on 44th Street on October 28, 2022, in New York, NY.

See also 
 New Blood Tag Team Championship

Notes

References

External links
 Official Strong Openweight Tag Team Championship History at New Japan Pro Wrestling
 NJPW STRONG Openweight Tag Team Title History at Cagematch.net

Openweight wrestling championships
New Japan Pro-Wrestling championships
Tag team wrestling championships
2022 establishments in Japan